Eponymous surgical procedures are generally named after the surgeon or surgeons who performed or reported them first. In some instances they are named after the surgeon who popularised them or refined existing procedures, and occasionally are named after the patient who first underwent the procedure.

Notes 

Surgical procedures
Surgical procedures and techniques